James Hanks (born 24 April 1984) is an English Former Rugby Union player who for played for Exeter Chiefs in the Aviva Premiership. He made his debut for Exeter Chiefs in 2005 against Cornish Pirates. He played As a Lock. He made 190 senior appearances for Exeter Chiefs and was named Players Player for the 2010/2011 season. He retired in 2014 after suffering a serious neck injury against Bath.

References

External links
 Exeter Profile

1984 births
Living people
English rugby union players
Exeter Chiefs players
Villager FC players
Rugby union players from Sidcup
Rugby union locks